The Scottish Premier League (SPL) was the highest level of the Scottish football league system between 1998 and 2013. During this period matches were played at 19 football stadiums. The inaugural round of SPL matches took place on the weekend of 1–2 August 1998, with five clubs hosting the opening fixtures. The league ceased after the 2012–13 Scottish Premier League season, when the SPL and Scottish Football League merged to form the Scottish Professional Football League.

Following the Hillsborough Disaster in 1989, the Taylor Report recommended the abolition of standing terraces by the start of the 1994–95 season, to be replaced by all-seater stadiums. In addition to this, the SPL initially demanded that all its stadia should have a minimum capacity of 10,000 seats, but later reduced that figure to 6,000. When Falkirk finished in a potential promotion position in 2000 and 2003, the SPL refused admission to membership because their Brockville Park did not have sufficient seating capacity. The SPL subsequently allowed Inverness Caledonian Thistle and Gretna to groundshare with other clubs. Some clubs promoted from the First Division, such as Hamilton Academical and Ross County, undertook ground improvements to meet the SPL criteria before entering the league.

The home stadiums of the Old Firm clubs, Celtic and Rangers, were amongst the largest stadiums in the United Kingdom. The other large stadium in Glasgow, Hampden Park, was never used for an SPL match because it is the home ground of amateur club Queen's Park, who have not been in the top flight of Scottish football since 1958. None of the other stadiums used for SPL matches had a capacity greater than 22,199 (Pittodrie Stadium in Aberdeen). This reflected the gap in attendances between the Old Firm and other Scottish football clubs. In the 2011–12 Scottish Premier League season, Celtic and Rangers both had average attendances of over 45,000, while no other club had an average attendance of greater than 14,000.

Stadiums

See also
List of football stadiums in Scotland
List of Scottish Football League stadiums
List of Scottish Professional Football League stadiums
Scottish football attendance records
 Scottish stadium moves

References

 

 
Scottish Premier League